Akoupé-Zeudji is a small village in southern Ivory Coast. It is located in the sub-prefecture of Anyama in the Autonomous District of Abidjan. Prior to 2011, it was in the Abidjan Department, Lagunes Region.

Akoupé-Zeudji has a private school and a public school, built by the government of the Abidjan Department  under the leadership of Governor Pierre Djédji Amondji, and also has a community centre, a private vocational training centre, and a nightclub.
In August 2011, the FRCI attacked Akoupé Zeudji and villages in the area, burning houses, due to it being the town of Prime Minister Gilbert Aké.

Akoupé-Zeudji was a commune until March 2012, when it became one of 1126 communes nationwide that were abolished.

Notes

Former communes of Ivory Coast
Populated places in Abidjan